The Antonov An-2  ("kukuruznik"—corn crop duster; USAF/DoD reporting name Type 22, NATO reporting name Colt) is a Soviet mass-produced single-engine biplane utility/agricultural aircraft designed and manufactured by the Antonov Design Bureau beginning in 1947. Its durability, high lifting power, and ability to take off and land from poor runways have given it a long service life. The An-2 was produced up to 2001 and remains in service with military and civilian operators around the world.

The An-2 was designed as a utility aircraft for use in forestry and agriculture, but the basic airframe is highly adaptable and numerous variants of the type have been developed; these include hopper-equipped versions for crop-dusting, scientific versions for atmospheric sampling, water-bombers for fighting forest-fires, flying ambulances, float-equipped seaplane versions and lightly armed combat versions for dropping paratroops. 

The most common version is the An-2T 12-seater passenger aircraft. All versions (other than the An-3 and the An-2-100) are powered by a  nine-cylinder Shvetsov ASh-62 radial engine, which was developed from the Wright R-1820. The An-2 typically consumes .

Design and development

Origins
The Antonov An-2 was designed to meet a 1940s Soviet Ministry of Forestry requirement for a replacement for the much lighter, largely wooden-airframed Polikarpov Po-2, which was used in large numbers in both agricultural and utility roles. Antonov designed a large single bay biplane of all-metal construction, with an enclosed cockpit and a cabin with seats for twelve passengers. The first prototype, designated SKh-1 and powered by a Shvetsov ASh-21 radial engine, flew on 31 August 1947.

Initial Soviet production was at State Factory 473 in Kyiv, Ukrainian SSR, where the bulk of up to 5,000 units had been produced by 1960. Later Soviet production (after 1965, of model An-2M especially) was at State Factory 464 at Dolgoprudniy, Russian SFSR. After 1960, most An-2s were constructed at Poland's WSK factory in Mielec; it is believed that over 13,000 aircraft were built in Poland before principal manufacturing activity ended during 1991.

Up until 2001, limited production was undertaken using remaining stocks of components, spares and maintenance coverage, such as a small batch of four aircraft that were produced for Vietnam. China also builds the An-2 under licence as the Shijiazhuang Y-5. It has been occasionally and erroneously reported that there was East German production of the An-2; while An-2s often underwent extensive refurbishment in East German facilities, no new aircraft were constructed there.

The An-2 is commonly used as a light utility transport, parachute drop aircraft, agricultural work and other tasks suited to a large slow biplane. Its slow flight and good short field performance make it suited for short, unimproved fields, and some specialized variants have also been built for cold weather and other extreme environments. The Guinness Book of World Records states that the 45-year production run for the An-2 was for a time the longest ever for any aircraft and challenged the well over two decades-long run of the much lighter, late-1920s origin Polikarpov Po-2 biplane it was intended to replace. The An-2's record was exceeded by the four-turboprop, 1954-origin, Lockheed C-130 Hercules military transport.

Further development

During the early 1980s, Antonov experimented with a development of the An-2 powered by a modern turboprop engine. The unit used was a  Glushenkov engine. Aircraft fitted with this engine had a longer, more streamlined nose to accommodate it. It received the designation of Antonov An-3.

During 2013, Antonov announced that it had successfully flown for the first time a new version of the An-2, dubbed the An-2-100, which was fitted with a three-blade reversible propeller and a  Motor Sich MS-14 turboprop running on kerosene rather than Avgas, which is no longer produced in CIS countries. That same year, the company stated that it had received orders for upgrading "hundreds" of the An-2 planes still in operation in Azerbaijan, Cuba and Russia to the An-2-100 upgrade version.

The Siberian Research Institute of Aviation (SIBNIA) has test flown a highly modified Antonov An-2 with carbon fibre winglet-like braces and carbon fibre wing structures. It was equipped with a five-bladed turboprop engine, most probably the Honeywell TPE331 already installed on a modernized version of the An-2 that entered service in 2014. According to Russian aviation company Sukhoi, this aircraft was built to demonstrate the aerodynamic and structural changes that were planned for an eventual An-2 replacement announced on 10 June 2015.  The autoclave-cured carbonfibre composite materials – including wing panels, spars and ribs – were produced by the Novosibirsk Aviation Plant. Sukhoi says the design change improved the speed of the An-2 by 50%, and testing also has shown the minimum flying speed of the aircraft is "close to zero".

Design

The Antonov An-2 is a mass-produced single-engine biplane that has been commonly used as a utility and agricultural aircraft. It is deliberately furnished with a minimum of complex systems. The crucial wing leading edge slats that give the aircraft its slow flight ability are fully automatic, being held closed by the airflow over the wings. Once the airspeed drops below , the slats will extend because they are on elastic rubber springs. Under typical conditions, the take-off is complete within  while the landing run requires ; these figures will vary dependent upon various factors, such as the aircraft's take-off/landing weight, the external air temperature, surface roughness, and headwind.

The An-2 is equipped with various design features which make it suitable for operation in remote areas with unsurfaced airstrips. It is fitted with a pneumatic brake system (similar to those used on heavy road vehicles) to stop on short runways, along with an air line attached to the compressor, so the pressure in the tires and shock absorbers can be adjusted without the need for installing specialised equipment. The batteries, while sizable, are relatively easy to remove, so the aircraft does not need a ground power unit to supply power for starting the engine. Likewise, there is no need for an external fuel pump to refuel the aircraft as it is provided with an inbuilt onboard pump, which allows the tanks to be filled from simple fuel drums.

According to the operating handbook, the An-2 has no stall speed. A note from the pilot's handbook reads: "If the engine quits in instrument conditions or at night, the pilot should pull the control column full aft and keep the wings level.

The An-2's ability, looks and flying characteristics, and its status as one of the world's biggest single-engined production biplanes, mean that demand for the An-2 is increasing in Western Europe and the United States, where they are prized by collectors of classic aircraft, making it an increasingly common sight at airshows. Many western countries prohibit the use of the An-2 commercially because the aircraft has not been certified by the relevant national aviation authorities. These restrictions vary by country, but all prevent the An-2 being used for any 'for profit' purpose, with the exception of the United States, where An-2s imported since 1993 are limited to experimental certification, but PZL-built An-2s are exempt from this restriction due to a bilateral agreement with Poland.

Operational history

Military service

The An-2 was adopted in bulk by both the Soviet Air Force and other Eastern Bloc military forces. It was first used in a military context during the Korean War of the early 1950s.

The Vietnam People's Air Force (VPAF) was another prolific user of the AN-2; during the Vietnam War, the service occasionally used the type as an attack aircraft.

On 12 January 1968, a clandestine TACAN site (call sign: Lima Site 85/Phou Pha Ti) installed by the United States Air Force in Northern Laos for directing USAF warplanes flying from Thailand to Vietnam was attacked by three North Vietnamese An-2s. A pair of An-2s fired on the outpost using a mixture of machine guns and rockets while a third An-2 orbited overhead to survey the assault.

An Air America Bell UH-1B, XW-PHF that had been resupplying the site gave chase to the two attacking aircraft. Using an AK-47, the American crew (Ted Moore Captain, Glen Wood Kicker) succeeded in shooting down one of the An-2s while the second aircraft was forced down by combined ground and air fire, eventually crashing into a mountain. The surviving Antonov returned to its home base, Gia Lam, near Hanoi.

During the Croatian War of Independence in 1991, a number of aged An-2 biplanes previously used for crop-spraying were converted by the Croatian Air Force to drop makeshift barrel bombs. They were also used to conduct supply missions to the town of Vukovar and other besieged parts of Croatia. 

The chief advantage for the An-2 was that they could take off and land in small or improvised airstrips. They were also frequently used to drop supplies by parachute on isolated garrisons. At least one AN-2 was shot down on 2 December 1991 over Vinkovci, eastern Slavonia, by a Serbian surface to air missile (SAM) emplacement which purportedly launched a salvo of SA-6s at the aircraft. 

Following the shootdown, the flights over Serbian lines ceased, due to the presence of Serb SA-6's. The previous radar guided AA systems were avoided by keeping the airplane's speed below , the speed of objects that radars were programmed to erase from the screen.

Reportedly, North Korea has operated a number of the AN-2s. The Korean People's Army Special Operation Force is known to use the An-2 to facilitate the infiltration of paratroopers. It has been speculated that in wartime, these aircraft could possibly be used to deliver troops behind enemy lines for sabotage operations.

As October, 2020 during the ongoing 2020 Nagorno-Karabakh war Azerbaijan Forces have been operating unmanned AN-2 for surveillance and bombing of Armenian defenses, however the type of the drone remaining unknown for Armenian sources. Armenian forces revealed footage of the alleged shotdown of Azerbaijani An-2, according to video evidence at least 11 An-2 have been destroyed, with 10 confirmed as shot down and one crashing after takeoff.

On March 2, 2022, Russian An-2s were observed being stationed at Seshcha Air Base, Bryansk Oblast. As the base is situated close to the border with Ukraine, it has been speculated that the aircraft are to be used as part of the ongoing 2022 Russian invasion of Ukraine.

Civil aviation 

Over the years, dozens of nations and companies alike have employed the An-2 in civil roles. The type was heavily used throughout the Soviet Union and the Eastern Bloc nations; in particular, Russian airline Aeroflot has operated a large number of the An-2s. During the Soviet era, the An-2 was used as a short-range airliner in Estonia, performing regular flights between the towns of Kuressaare and Kärdla, which reside on separate islands, Saaremaa and Hiiumaa.

Since the collapse of the Soviet Union and the various communist states of Eastern Europe, most airlines in these regions have been withdrawing their An-2s from service. This is due to some of these aircraft being over 40 years old, as well as a result of the decline in the production of avgas to fuel the type. Private operators are typically still using the An-2s, as their stability, capacity and slow-flying ability has made them relatively popular for some functions, such as for skydiving. 

Whilst their relatively high noise levels, increasing maintenance costs, high fuel consumption and unsophisticated nature (the pre-flight checks alone take between 30 and 40 minutes) has rendered them obsolete for the majority of commercial routes in Europe, the large number of aircraft available means that unit prices are especially low in comparison to contemporaries (being available from as little as US$30,000 for a serviceable example). The price factor has made them highly attractive for continued use in the developing world, where their ability to carry large loads into short airstrips makes them assets to airlines on a budget. Many ex-Aeroflot An-2s have since found work with regional operators across Africa, Central and South America, Cuba and southeast Asia.

As of 2015, there were thousands of An-2s remaining in operation around the world, including over 1,500 in Russia, 294 in Kazakhstan and 54 in Ukraine.

Variants

Soviet / Polish production
 Izdeliye F – The in-house designation for the An-2NAK observation aircraft which was later re-designated An-2K and/or An-2F.
 Izdeliye K – A prototype weather reconnaissance/research aircraft with an observers cockpit immediately forward of the fin above the rear fuselage. First flown on 21 March 1948 'Izdeliye K' was found to be under-powered and unable to carry out its intended mission at high altitude, the aircraft was abandoned after a landing accident in October 1948. The concept was resurrected in 1954 as the 'An-2ZA' / 'An-6 Meteo'.
 Izdeliye T – The original design concept originated at OKB-153 in Novosibirsk.
 Izdeliye Sh – The in-house designation for the 'Izdeliye T' (presumably to confuse spies or infiltrators) design project at Novosibirsk.
 SKh-1 – the original designation of the An-2 used during the design phase of the project before the OKB had been named after Antonov.
 An-2A – Developed from the An-2T for use as a Balloon interceptor to intercept reconnaissance balloons from, US intelligence assets, over-flying the USSR. The prototype was converted from a Kiev built An-2 (c/n 110347315) using the Turbo-charged Ash-62IR/TK of the 'An-6 Meteo' and a combined searchlight/gun turret mounted on top of the rear fuselage, which mounted either a single Gryazev-Shipunov GSh-23 23 mm calibre twin-barrelled cannon or a single Afanas'yev A-12.7 12.7 mm calibre heavy machine-gun.
 An-2E (Ekranoplan – wing in ground effect) (first use of the designation) – One of a series of projects from the early 1970s for WIG (Wing In Ground effect) derivatives of the An-2, designed at the TsLST (Tsentral'naya Laboratoriya Spasatel'noy Techniki – central laboratory for new types of rescue equipment).
 An-2E (second use of the designation) – An Ekranoplan conversion of an An-2P (RA-84692). The fuselage was retained and a large trapezoidal monoplane wing having extended wingtips with approx 45° dihedral, attached to the lower wing attachment points. The prototype conversion was intended to be a floatplane; however, its first public appearance was as a landplane with the standard An-2 undercarriage. Jointly developed by the Moscow Aviation Institute, MARZ (Moskovskiy Aviaremontnyy Zavod – Moscow Aircraft Overhaul Plant) and The TSZP-Saturn research institute the An-2E was also known as EA-00078.
 An-2F – Developed concurrently with the An-2 prototype, 'Izdeliye F' was an experimental artillery-observation aircraft with a twin-tail, ventral observer's position and dorsal defensive machine-gun position. The initial service designation of An-2NAK was changed to An-2F once post test flight modifications had been carried out. Two prototypes were built, with the first completed in the summer of 1948, but flight testing was delayed to April 1949 due to the need to incorporate modifications called up from the standard An-2 flight test programme. The flight test of the An-2F showed that the aircraft met all the requirements of the specification, but helicopters were demonstrating that they could perform the artillery correction role without the need to provide fixed base airstrip for them to operate from, thus the An-2F was not proceeded with and the two prototypes were retained by the Antonov bureau for hack duties with one later serving as a flying wind tunnel to investigate para-dropping from the Antonov An-8 twin-turboprop transport.
 An-2F (second use of designation) – A VTOL project with vertical thrust to be provided by a Mikulin AM-9 turbojet in the rear fuselage.
 An-2F (third use of the designation) – A proposed photo-mapping aircraft project, from the early 1990s, similar to the An-2PF equipped with one of five alternate cameras. Overall control was to have been by IBM 286 computer and the camera could be augmented or replaced by a thermal imaging system, Infra-Red imaging system, AP-6E autopilot, LDI-3 laser rangefinder and/or a GPS global positioning system.
 An-2G (a.k.a. An-2Geo) – During 1974 WSK-Mielec developed a geo-physical survey aircraft for the Polish State Geophysical Survey Agency (Państwowe Przedsiębiorstwo Poszukiwań Geofizycznych), with equipment for measuring magnetic fields, radiation and other instruments for prospecting. Adapted to fly in tropical latitudes at low altitude the 'An-2G' could fly for six hours and two were used for survey work in Nigeria in 1974.
 An-2L (Lesozashchita – forestry protection) – A fire bomber variant with three cassettes each holding 120 ampoules, containing 1litre (34 fl.oz.) of fire-retardant which were dropped as required. Trials revealed that this system was inefficient and further work was abandoned.
 An-2LL (Letayuschaya Laboratoriya – flying laboratory) – Any of a number of An-2s used as testbeds for various equipment. One An-2SKh (RA-70547), modified by the State Research Institute of Aircraft Systems. (GosNII AS – Gosudarstvennyy Nauchno-Issledovatel'skiy Institut Aviatsionnykh Sistem), for environmental research, had a lateral observation blister which has often caused the aircraft to be misidentified as an An-2PF.
 An-2LP (Lesopozharnyy – forest firefighter) – A single prototype converted from an An-2V floatplane, with 630 litre(139 Imp.Gal.) water tanks in each float for dropping on fires. The water tanks could be re-filled in flight, as the aircraft skimmed the surface of suitable bodies of water. Prior to dropping an alkaline wetting agent (NP-1 Sulphanol) was added to the water which was released through the scoops which also picked up the water to refill the tanks. Ten production aircraft were built seeing service in the Siberian and Far East regions of the USSR.
 An-2LV (Lesnoj Vodnyj – forest hydroplane) – A firefighting waterbomber.
 An-2M (Polish:[samolot] Morski – seaplane) – Polish production of the An-2V floatplane, designated An-2M, (not to be confused with the Soviet designation An-2M). Also known as the An-2W.
 An-2M (Modifitsirovannyy – modified) – The designation An-2M was also used in the USSR for a much improved agricultural crop-sprayer/duster. The An-2M featured an all-duralumin welded and bonded fuselage, lockable tailwheel, enlarged fibre-glass hopper, Shvetsov ASh-62 radial engine with power take off to an auxiliary gearbox to drive the dusting/spraying equipment, an angular fin of increased area and a hermetically sealed cockpit with no access to the cabin/hopper area. Due to lack of capacity at the Kiev factory and WSK-Mielec the An-2M was manufactured at DMZ N0.464 (Dolgoproodnyy Machinery Factory No.464) to the north of Moscow.
 An-2P (Polish: Pasażerski – passenger) (Russian: Passazhirskiy – passenger) – Soviet and Polish production of a standard passenger variant. Soviet production An-2P's had 10 permanently installed seats in a heated insulated cabin. Polish production aircraft had 12–14 seats, two jump seats for children and a baby cot. A total of 837 An-2P's were built.
 An-2P (Protivopozharnij – fire-fighting with water) – A fire-fighting aircraft with a dumpable hopper filled with water and/or retardant.
 An-2PD-5 (Polish: Pasażerski [samolot] Dyspozycyjny – executive aircraft's) – The production version of the 'An-2PD-6', featuring almost identical interior furnishings with a work table and reading light replacing one of the chairs.
 An-2PD-6 (Polish: Pasażerski [samolot] Dyspozycyjny – executive aircraft's) – A prototype six seat VIP variant of the An-2P produced at WSK-Mielec in 1970, featuring a folding table, mini-bar, pantry and toilet.
 An-2PF – Soviet production An-2 aircraft configured for photo-mapping/survey tasks with camera hatches protected by sliding hatches on the undersurface of the fuselage.
 An-2PF – A joint request from the Polish State mapping Agency (Państwowe Przedsiębiorstwo Kartografii) led to Polish production of eight 'An-2PF' aircraft configured for photo-mapping/survey tasks with camera hatches protected by sliding hatches on the undersurface of the fuselage.
 An-2PK – A polar research aircraft developed by WSK-Mielec with heated skis, insulated cabin and an additional cabin heater.
 An-2PRTV – A single Polish production An-2, (SP-TVN, c/n1G 15944), modified as a television broadcast relay aircraft for the Polish Radio and Television Co. (Polskie Radio i Telewizja).
 An-2RA – A projected up-graded Agricultural aircraft, based on the An-2R, developed at WSK-Mielec.
 An-2RT (Russian: Rele Translyator – relay translator) – A single An-2 was converted to a telemetry relay station, for missile development work, relaying telemetry from test missiles to a ground station.
 An-2S (Sanitarnyy – medical) – The An-2S was an adaptation of the standard An-2T cargo plane with up to six stretcher patients or three stretchers and six walking wounded along with attendants and support equipment.
 An-2SKh (Sel'skoKhozyaistvennyy – agricultural) – The agricultural version optimised for crop-spraying and crop-dusting. A metal construction chemical hopper was installed in the cabin near the centre of gravity, feeding a spreader through a 300mm orifice. Powdered or granulated chemicals were loaded through a hatch in the roof of the cabin and liquid chemical through a special connector on the port side of the fuselage. Early An-2SKh's were typically limited to a 6,000-hour life, as opposed to a normal life of 12,000 hours, due to the corrosive effects of the chemicals. The introduction of epoxy based corrosion protection systems partly alleviated the situation, allowing the agricultural An-2s to continue flying for much longer. Five An-2SKh aircraft were converted to firefighters, from 1954, by pressurising the hopper filled with water and/or retardant and ejecting it from a nozzle in place of the dusting/spraying equipment, single aircraft were allocated to Civil Air Directorates across the country but proved relatively ineffectual.
 An-2T (Transportnyy – cargo) – The baseline first production model for cargo and mail carriage.
 An-2TD (Transportno-Desantnyy – cargo/paratrooper) – paratrooper version with 12 seats, static line attachment cables and drop signalling lights.
 An-2TP (Transportno-Passazhirskiy – cargo/passenger) – A convertible passenger/cargo version, with tip-up seats for ten, released in 1949.
 An-2TPS (Transportno-Passazhirskiy Sanitarnyy – cargo/passenger medical) – Polish production of ambulance aircraft derived from An-2TP aircraft with three stretchers each side and two medical attendants.
 An-2V (Vodnyy – water-based) – A seaplane version of the baseline An-2 fitted with twin floats supported on wire-braced struts at the undercarriage attachment points and rear fuselage. Floatplane An-2s manufactured in Kiev were designated An-4 but there is little evidence that this designation was widely used. At least one An-2V. AN-2V Video
 An-2V (Vysotnyy – high altitude) – Six aircraft were built, at the Kiev factory, as weather reconnaissance An-2V's for use at high altitude. Powered by the ASh-62IR/TK turbo-charged engine, they differed from the 'An-6 Meteo' by not having the observers cockpit forward of the fin.
 An-2VA – water bomber.
 An-2W (Wodnosamolot – seaplane) – Polish production of the An-2V, also sometimes designated An-2M (not to be confused with the improved variant).
 An-2ZA (Zondirovaniye Atmosfery – atmosphere sampling) – The initial designation for a high altitude meteorological research re-designated as the 'An-6 Meteo'.
 An-3 (first use of the designation) – A radical redesign of the An-2A to intercept reconnaissance balloons from US intelligence assets, over-flying the USSR. With a high aspect ratio monoplane high-set wing, turbo-charged ASh-62IR/TK and a combined searchlight/gun turret mounted on top of the rear fuselage.
 An-3 (second use of designation) – In an effort to replace the An-2SKh, after the poor performance of the abortive WSK-Mielec M-15 Belphegor, it was proposed to fit a turboprop engine on an all new fuselage featuring a hunchback for the cockpit and An-2M tail surfaces. This design was not carried through and a less ambitious re-design resulted in the third and final use of the An-3 designation.
 An-3 (third use of designation) – The prototype An-3 with a  Glushenkov TVD-20 turboprop engine, sealed cockpit with separate entrance door above lower wing leading edge and air conditioning to improve the cockpit environment. Two prototypes were built (CCCP-06131 and CCCP37901) with a third registration (CCCP26700) which is believed to be a re-registration of one of the other two registrations. The flight tests and trials progressed well and the two prototypes set no less than six World Records for payload to altitude in their class. Due to the collapse of the USSR initial plans for production and variants were shelved until 1993 when production of converted aircraft began, as the An-3T, at the Omsk 'Polyot' factory.
 An-3T – Due to the large number of surplus An-2s available the An-3T was not produced from scratch but by converting aircraft which had at least 50% of their life remaining. All the aircraft were re-registered and given new construction numbers.
 An-3TK – A convertible passenger /cargo version with six foldable twin seats.
 An-3SKh – An agricultural version tested with one of the original prototypes but with no known production conversions.
 An-3P – A forest fire fighting water bomber with a tank installed in the fuselage.
 An-3S – A projected ambulance version with six stretchers and two medical attendants.
 An-3D – Projected military troopship version with tip-up seats for paratroopers.
 An-4 – This designation was used for An-2V seaplanes produced at Kiev, but does not seem to be used much. This is either due to very limited production at Kiev or operators not making the distinction between the An-2V and An-4.
 An-6 – A transport aircraft fitted with the Shvetsov Ash-62IR/TK turbo-charged engine was produced for use in mountainous areas at high altitudes. An unknown number were delivered to the Tajik Civil Aviation Directorate and the Polar directorate for use in the far north of the USSR and to support the USSR's Antarctic research stations.
An-6 Meteo – After the failure of 'Izdeliye K', the Antonov bureau was tasked with developing the 'An-2ZA' high-altitude weather reconnaissance aircraft based on the An-2. Featuring the same observers cockpit, forward of the vertical stabiliser above the rear fuselage, used on 'Izdeliye K', power was supplied by a turbo-charged Shvetsov Ash-62IR/TK which enabled the 'An-2ZA' to carry out its intended high-altitude research role. The 'An-2ZA' was re-designated 'An-6 Meteo' early in its career and continued to fly until a take-off accident in September 1958 caused extensive damage.
 Grach-2 (Grach-Rook) – Students from the SKB MAI (Studencheskoye Konstruktorskoye Byuro Moskovskii Aviatsionii Institut [Sergo Ordjonikidze] – student construction bureau Moscow Aviation Institute [Sergo Ordjonikidze]) studied agricultural aircraft utilising the WIG effect. Their first effort, named Grach-2, was a standard An-2 fuselage mated to low-set inverted gull. reverse-delta monoplane wings with couter, constant chord, dihedral sections and fitted with a t-tail.
 Grach-3 – The second projected WIG agricultural aircraft from the SKB MAI was the Grach-3. This aircraft was to have been similar to the Grach-2 but utilising a centre section with near constant chord which allowed the tailplane to be dispensed with and pitch controlled by elevators at the rear of the centre section.
 Lala-1 – A research prototype with an open-frame rear fuselage, twin tail and twin tailwheels supported by struts under the rear of the fuselage pod. An Ivchenko AI-25 turbofan engine was fitted in the rear of the fuselage pod for use as a development model for the WSK-Mielec M-15 Belphegor agricultural aircraft.
 SibNIA TVS-2MS – Turboprop conversion of An-2 by Siberian Aeronautical Research Institute (SibNIA) using  Honeywell TPE331-12UHR engine. First flown 5 September 2011. Deliveries to the Aerial Forest Protection Service began in 2014, with six flying by August 2014 and 16 in service by early 2017.

 SibNIA TVS-2-DT – Fitted with new composite wings (with no bracing struts or wires) and tail. First flight 10 June 2015.
 SibNIA TVS-2-DTS – TVS-2-DT fitted with new all-composite fuselage. Production planned at Ulan-Ude Aviation Plant from 2019 to meet a requirement for at least 200 aircraft to be delivered from 2021 to 2025.

Chinese variants
 Feng Shou-2 (Harvester-2) – The name given to the first Nanchang built agricultural 'Y-5II'.
 Feihong-98 (FH-98) – Unmanned transport aircraft with a payload of 1.5 tonnes.
 Nanchang Y-5 – (Yunshuji – transport) Chinese version of An-2, initially built from Soviet blueprints and with supervision from Soviet advisors, 727 had been built when production was transferred to Harbin in 1968.
 Nanchang Y-5II – Crop-sprayer/duster with a chemical hopper/tank in the cabin and interchangeable spraying/dustiong equipment. Cooling of the cockpit was increased to improve comfort in the sub-tropical regions of China. 229 built.
 Shijiazhuang Y-5A – First mass-produced, Shijiazhuang built, version, light passenger transport, equivalent to the An-2T, 114 built.
 Shijiazhuang Y-5B – Shijiazhuang built agricultural aircraft, equivalent to the An-2 SKh.
 Shijiazhuang Y-5B-100 – Y-5B aircraft fitted with triple tipsails on the upper wing tips, which reputedly gave 20% higher climb rate and improved L/D ratio by 15%.
 Shijiazhuang Y-5B(T) – A para-dropping version developed for the PLAAF, with up-dated avionics including a GPS.
 Shijiazhuang Y-5B(K) – Variously reported as a tourist variant or Agricultural variant.
 Shijiazhuang Y-5B(D) – Variously reported as an Agricultural variant or Tourist variant.
 Nanchang Y-5C – Amphibian version of Y-5A fitted with two floats.
 Nanchang Y-5D – Bomber crew trainer.

 Nanchang Y-5K – A VIP passenger variant with five seats. Eleven were delivered to the PLAAF from 1958. A seven seater was delivered to Ho Chi Minh in North Vietnam and two were given to the Nepal Royal Flight for use by King Birendra.
 Shijiazhuang Y-5B (turboprop) – A projected turboprop upgrade conversion programme replacing the 1,000 hp Huosai-5 radial engine with a more powerful turboprop.

Ukrainian variants

 An-2-100 – Modification of the design first flown in 2013 with a modern 3-bladed reversible propeller and a 1500shp Motor Sich Sich MS-14 turboprop engine running on kerosene rather than Avgas.  First flew on 10 July 2013 in Kiev

Operators
The aircraft is popular with air charter companies and small airlines, and is operated by private individuals and companies.

Military operators

Current

Azerbaijani Air Force 

Bulgarian Air Force

Georgian Air Force
 
Moldovan Air Force 

Latvian Air Force

Korean People's Air Force

Serbian Air Force and Air Defence

Former

Albanian Air Force

Armenian Air Force

People's Liberation Army Air Force
People's Liberation Army Naval Air Force

Croatian Air Force

Cuban Air Force

Egyptian Air Force

Estonian Air Force

Hungarian Air Force

Mongolian People's Air Force

Polish Air Force

Romanian Air Force

Soviet Air Force
Soviet Naval Aviation

Vietnam People's Air Force

Yemen Air Force

Specifications (An-2)

Accidents and incidents

As of 8 January 2023 there have been 802 An-2 hull-loss accidents, claiming a total of 825 lives. One of the most recent accidents occurred around 13:30 on 14 November 2022 in the Everglades, when an Antonov An-2, which had been seized by U.S. Customs and Border Protection was being transported to Fort Lauderdale Executive Airport and overturned during a forced landing caused by an engine failure. Both pilots survived.

The first known post-WWII act of suicide by pilot was with an Antonov An-2. Timofei Shovkunov stole an An-2 and flew it directly into his apartment building in Voroshilovgrad (now Luhansk) on March 27, 1972, apparently despondent after his wife having left along with his son the day before. He was the lone casualty.

In the third known post-WWII act of suicide by pilot, on September 26, 1976, Russian national Vladimir Serkov made an unauthorized takeoff with an Antonov An-2 (Reg # USSR-79868) from Novosibirsk-Severny Airport. He crashed the aircraft into the stairwell of an apartment complex at Stepnaya st., house 43 / 1, where his ex-wife's parents lived, in an attempt to kill his ex-wife. After completing two laps around the scene, Serkov attempted to pilot the plane to the parents' apartment where his wife and two-year-old son were visiting. The aircraft pierced the stairwell between the 3rd and 4th floors, and being fueled with 800 liters of gasoline, ignited a large fire inside the stairwell that ultimately spread to damage 30 total apartments. Firefighters were on scene in five minutes, taking 57 minutes to extinguish the blaze. A four-year-old and two six-year-old children were killed at the scene from burns. Another four-year-old child died eight days later as a result of burns. In total, 11 residents were injured as a result of fire burns. Serkov's ex-wife (and her parents) and his toddler son were not injured in the incident.

See also

References

Citations

Bibliography

 Gunston, Bill. The Osprey Encyclopedia of Russian Aircraft 1875–1995. London: Osprey, 1995. .
 Mader, Georg. "Hvratske Zrance Snage: Croatia's embargoed air force". World Air Power Journal, Volume 24 Spring 1996. London:Aerospace Publishing. . pp. 139–147.
 Gordon, Yefim & Komissarov, Dmitry. Antonov An-2. Midland. Hinkley. 2004. .
 Gordon, Yefim & Komissarov, Dmitry. Chinese Aircraft. Hikoki Publications. Manchester. 2008. .

External links

 an2plane.ru - the most detailed website about the aircraft An-2 plane An-2 (Russian and English)
 Antonov An-2 article on Air Vectors
 www.aviation.ru
 Antonov-2 walkaround
 www.bush-planes.com
 A very high resolution panoramic image of an An-2 cockpit
 Walkaround An-2 from Sokolovaya Balka, Ukraine
 Walkaround An-2SKh from Kyrgyz Aviation college
 GenAIRation Antonov
 A short video of a flight with an Antonov An-2

An-002
Soviet and Russian agricultural aircraft
1940s Soviet civil utility aircraft
1940s Soviet military utility aircraft
Biplanes
Single-engined tractor aircraft
STOL aircraft
Aircraft first flown in 1947